The 1978 NASCAR Grand National Winston Cup Series was the 30th season of professional stock car racing in the United States and the 7th modern era NASCAR Cup series. The season began on Sunday, January 22 and ended on Sunday, November 19. Cale Yarborough driving the Junior Johnson #11 First National City Travelers Checks Oldsmobile won his then record third consecutive NASCAR Grand National Winston Cup Winston Cup. Ronnie Thomas was crowned NASCAR Rookie of the Year in a tight battle with Roger Hamby.

Season recap

Notable races
Winston Western 500 - NASCAR banned the Chevrolet Laguna S3 racecar but also allowed Chevrolet engines to be used in other General Motors brands; as a result teams were fielding Monte Carlos, Chevrolet Malibus, Buick Centuries, and Oldsmobile Cutlasses.  The Oldsmobile brand  reached its first win since 1959 as Cale Yarborough drove Junior Johnson's Olds to the win.  Bobby Allison, making his debut in Bud Moore's Ford, fell out after 40 laps, while Richard Petty finished 16th after rearend failure; Petty was driving the 1974 Dodge Charger for the final time as the car's Winston Cup Grand National eligibility ended after this race.
Daytona 125s - The two qualifying races for the Daytona 500 were the first superspeedway test of the new 1977-78 model racecars now eligible for NASCAR competition.   Preseason testing had exposed serious stability issues with the cars, particularly the Olds Cutlass with its shorter rear deck and open rear side windows; Cale Yarborough and Donnie Allison were pointed in their concerns about the instability of the Olds (said Donnie, "I can't drive the Olds, it moves around too much"); Richard Petty was similarly critical of the Dodge Magnum ("The Magnum is undriveable at 190 MPH") he now was fielding.  Cale won the pole for the 500 while Ron Hutcherson timed second.   In the 125s the lead changed a combined 25 times.  Bobby Allison and Buddy Baker crashed out of the first 125 while A. J. Foyt drove a superspeedway Buick to win it.  Darrell Waltrip drove a Monte Carlo, edging Richard Petty's Magnum in the second; Waltrip said after the win, "Richard Petty has the fastest car here."
Daytona 500 - Richard Petty led 26 laps in his 125, and his Magnum was pronounced the fastest car in Daytona by Waltrip after the Twins.  Petty raced to the lead with Waltrip and David Pearson drafting him.  By Lap 61 they had put all but Bobby Allison and Buddy Baker a lap down, but in Turn Four Petty blew a tire and all three hit the wall, then slid into the inside wall.  Following the restart Benny Parsons spun out after blowing a tire while A. J. Foyt was drop-kicked by Lennie Pond and tumbled through the infield grass; he was cut from the car and hospitalized.  Allison took the lead with ten to go and Buddy Baker blew his engine, leaving Allison uncontested for his first Cup win since 1975.
Richmond 400 - Lennie Pond took the lead after Cale Yarborough led 69 laps and by the final 100 laps seemed in control of the race, but a blown tire put Benny Parsons into the lead and Parsons won by nearly three seconds over Pond.  The 142 laps led were the most Pond had led in a race to date, surpassing the 113 laps led at the 1976 American 500.
Carolina 500 - Pearson reached a NASCAR milestone with his 100th Grand National win, running down Benny Parsons on a frigid raceday.
Atlanta 500 - NASCAR mandated larger spoiler sizes to combat the instability of the new racecars beginning with the Atlanta 500.  Bobby Allison led 261 laps and put the entire field a lap down en route to the win.  Darrell Waltrip blew his engine after 146 laps then publicly called out his pit crew; "Every time I pitted, I fell further behind."
Southeastern 500 - After his crew repaired damage in an early crash, Darrell Waltrip drove to victory at Bristol and praised his crew for their work.
Rebel 500 - Benny Parsons grabbed his second win of the season, leading 83 laps after his team had to change engines before the race.  "This one was a stick of dynamite," Parsons said of the new engine.
Winston 500 - Rain delayed the Winston 500 from May 7 to Mother's Day May 14 - and also pushed back the scheduled Music City 420 at Nashville as well.  The Talladega race saw 44 official lead changes as Cale Yarborough battled Darrell Waltrip, Richard Petty, and others; Benny Parsons and Dick Brooks stormed to the lead on the opening lap and Parsons led it, but fell out with clutch failure 121 laps in.  Petty battled for the lead but on a late caution (for Lennie Pond's spin) his transmission acted up, and he lost five laps getting it fixed (he finished 11th).   Yarborough drafted past Buddy Baker on the final lap for only his second win of the year.
World 600 - Darrell Waltrip, Donnie Allison, Bobby Allison, Cale Yarborough, David Pearson, and Benny Parsons dominated the 600 as the lead changed 43 times between them, the most competitive Charlotte race to that point.  A last-lap crash knocked out Pearson and Parsons as Waltrip took the first of five 600s.  Richard Petty finished a distant eighth and was more and more frustrated by the Dodge Magnum; it took several trips through the inspection line before he was cleared to race.  Willy T. Ribbs, noted road racer, was slated to drive an ex-Bud Moore Torino purchased by Will Cronkite in the 600 but did not attend two scheduled test sessions then was arrested for driving the wrong way up a one-way street; Cronkite hired local racer Dale Earnhardt to drive the car.
Music City 420 - Yarborough stormed past pole-sitter Lennie Pond and led all 420 laps, putting the entire field two laps or more down.  It was the last wire-to-wire win in a Cup race until 2000.  Cale also took the point lead from Benny Parsons.
Gabriel 400 - Cale's domination of the season continued as he made up a lap on the race's only yellow (at Lap 108) and led the last 59 laps to an easy win.  "Surely he must have a big engine," Pearson said after the race, while Glen Wood said, "He's made up some laps in mysterious fashion."
Firecracker 400 - Cale Yarborough spun out while drafting David Pearson (who himself lost a lap with a flat tire earlier in the race) with some 33 laps to go; he recovered and his last-lap attempt was foiled when Pearson boxed him behind Baxter Price and grabbed a three-length win, his record fifth in the Firecracker.
Nashville 420 - Yarborough's domination of the season continued as he led 411 laps and finished two laps ahead of Waltrip.
Coca-Cola 500 - Darrell Waltrip grabbed his second big-track win of the season, beating David Pearson by nearly a second.  Richard Petty led briefly but fell out with engine failure following announcement that he would park the Dodge Magnum after the Talladega 500 in favor of a Chevrolet he'd purchased from Cecil Gordon.
Talladega 500 - Cale and Buddy Baker fought it out as the lead changed 67 times (a motorsports record until 1984) overall.  Baker's engine failure left Yarborough seemingly alone but the final eleven laps became a showdown between Lennie Pond and Donnie Allison; on the final lap Bill Elliott's blown tire slowed Allison enough for Pond to storm to his only career Winston Cup win.   Richard Petty fought for the lead but ran out of fuel past halfway and finished two laps down in seventh in his final race in a Dodge.
Champion Spark Plug 400 - Petty debuted a Chevrolet he'd purchased from Cecil Gordon and ran strong in the 400 before a blown tire sent him hard into the guardrail with ten laps to go.  Darrell Waltrip pitted under the yellow; Dave Marcis ran dry and had to be pushed by D.K. Ulrich; Pearson got four tires under the yellow and when the green and white flags flew he blew past Waltrip; Cale Yarborough grabbed second while Marcis finished fourth.
Volunteer 500 - Cale led 327 laps en route to the win, but the story of the race was an ugly set-to between pole-sitter Lennie Pond and Darrell Waltrip; Waltrip had declared before the race that he would drive the Ranier Racing car Pond presently drove in 1979 and would buy out his contract (running through 1982) with DiGard; on Lap 104 Waltrip sideswiped Pond's Chevy, and three laps later a tire blew, sending Pond hard into Waltrip; Pond was later eliminated when he collided with Cecil Gordon and climbed the frontstretch wall ("It was just an accident," Pond said of the crash with Gordon, "Cecil didn't see me").  The race was scheduled to Saturday night by new track promoter Gary Baker.
Southern 500 - Cale led 203 laps en route to his fourth Southern 500 win, while finishing a distant fourth was Terry Labonte, hired to drive Billy Hagan's car after Skip Manning, citing lack of sponsorship, left the team.
Capital City 400 - Darrell Waltrip's controversial career took a major popularity hit after winning at Richmond Fairgrounds Raceway.  He spun out winless Neil Bonnett, the race's defending champion, and was booed loudly by the crowd.
Delaware 500 - Bobby Allison grabbed his first win since March, but his postrace interview centered on a trip to the Mayo Clinic days before the race.  J.D. McDuffie won his only career pole, doing so on McCreary tires, a first for the tire company.
Wilkes 400 - Unaided by yellows, Cale Yarborough erased a two-lap deficit and led the final 19 laps for his ninth win of the season.
National 500 - Richard Petty raced to the lead and battled Bobby Allison and company, looking for his first win of the season; Petty's Chevrolet led 102 laps but fell out when the ignition failed after 220 laps.   Allison won by nearly a lap over Darrell Waltrip.  David Pearson led 35 laps after winning his 11th straight Charlotte pole but fell out of contention late, finishing fifth.  The lead changed 40 times among nine drivers.
Dixie 500 - NASCAR suffered an embarrassing scoring breakdown as Donnie Allison made up a lap and stormed past Richard Petty and Dave Marcis with three laps to go.  Allison was flagged the winner, but NASCAR announced scoring showed Petty beating Marcis by a wheel for the win.  Scorer Earl Sappenfield, however, thought something still wasn't right; chief scorer Morris Metcalfe was told by one of his scorers - 16-year-old Brian France - that Donnie had in fact run a lap that hadn't been properly scored, and was thus the winner.  When the announcement was made that Allison indeed had won, Bill France Jr. said, "First we need to wipe the egg off our face." Finishing fourth - following a strong second to Bobby Allison in a 300-mile Late Model Sportsman race at Charlotte the previous month - was Dale Earnhardt in a second Rod Osterlund car.
Los Angeles Times 500 - Cale Yarborough had to pit on the pace lap to correct ignition problems; he joined the field as the leaders were on the backstretch of the opening lap.  The lead officially changed 11 times in the opening 21 laps and twice a lap several times; ultimately the lead changed 30 official times.  Bobby Allison led 134 laps while Richard Petty was his strongest challenger, leading 30 laps before his engine failed.  Allison took the win with Yarborough second.  Dave Marcis finished 27th; his team owner Rod Osterlund entered two cars as he'd done at Atlanta; to preserve the rookie of the year status for 1979 for Dale Earnhardt, West Coast ace Jimmy Insolo started the race in the second Osterlund car and Earnhardt drove in relief, finishing seventh.   The hiring of Earnhardt upset Marcis, who was already upset with team manager Roland Wlodyka; Marcis disliked the rookie's attitude coming into the series and left Osterlund's team; Osterlund thus named Earnhardt full-time driver. This was the last race without Terry Labonte in the field until the 2000 Brickyard 400

Full Drivers’ Championship

(key) Bold – Pole position awarded by time. Italics – Pole position set by owner's points. * – Most laps led. ** – All laps led.

References

External links
 Winston Cup Standings and Statistics for 1978

 

NASCAR Cup Series seasons